The Sarasaviya Best Emerging Actor Award is presented annually by the weekly Sarasaviya newspaper in collaboration with the Associated Newspapers of Ceylon Limited at the Sarasaviya Awards Festival. Although the Sarasaviya Awards Ceremony began in 1964, this award was introduced much later. Following is a list of the winners of this title since then.

2016- Ishara Wickramasinghe

Emerging Actor